Keziah Veendorp (born 17 February 1998) is a Dutch professional footballer who plays as centre back for Eredivisie club FC Emmen.

He is Indonesian of Moluccan descent.

Club career

Early career
In 2005, Veendorp started his football career with FVV Foxhol and moved to VV Hoogezand in 2006. When he came to FC Groningen is 2008.

Groningen
In 2016, Veendorp was called up for Groningen first team. He made his league debut on 20 February 2016 in a 1–4 loss against AZ Alkmaar at AFAS Stadion. In this match, he played 11 minutes, after he was substituted for Juninho Bacuna.

International career
On 17 October 2013, He was first called up and played for Netherlands U17 against Faroe Islands U17 In 2014, he played 2014 UEFA European Under-17 Championship as one of the key players. In the competition, he contributed that Netherlands finished the competition as a runners-up, playing 5 games.

Club career statistics

References

External links
 

1997 births
Living people
People from Hoogezand-Sappemeer
Association football defenders
Dutch footballers
Netherlands youth international footballers
FC Groningen players
FC Emmen players
Eredivisie players
Eerste Divisie players
Dutch people of Indonesian descent
Footballers from Groningen (province)